Chinavita is a town and municipality in the Neira Province, part of the Colombian department of Boyacá.

Etymology 
The name Chinavita is derived from Chibcha and means "illuminated hilltop". Another explanation is "our hill".

History 
The area of Chinavita before the Spanish conquest was inhabited by the Muisca. Chinavita was ruled by the zaque of Hunza.

Modern Chinavita was founded in 1822, before it was a vereda of Garagoa.

Economy 
Main economical activities of Chinavita are agriculture and livestock farming. Agricultural products cultivated in Chinavita are potatoes, sugarcane, tomatoes, bananas, coffee and fique.

References 

Municipalities of Boyacá Department
Populated places established in 1822
1822 establishments in Gran Colombia
Muisca Confederation
Muysccubun